Tine Scheuer-Larsen (born 13 March 1966) is a retired tennis player from Denmark.

She became Danish Champion in singles in 1981 age 15 as the youngest Danish player ever. She also became the highest ranked Danish female player on 29 September 1986, when she became the number 34 of the world. Both records were broken by Caroline Wozniacki in 2004 and 2008 respectively. She became a professional in 1980 and retired in 1994, having won seven doubles titles on the WTA Tour.

Scheuer-Larsen is also one of three players to record a golden set in the professional era. In the 1995 Fed Cup Europe/Africa Zone, she achieved a golden set against Mmaphala Letsatle. She went on to win the match 6–0, 6–0.

Career finals

Singles (1 runner-up)

Doubles (7-7)

ITF finals

Singles (6–0)

Doubles (4–2)

Records

References

External links
 
 
 
 

1966 births
Living people
Danish female tennis players
Olympic tennis players of Denmark
People from Egedal Municipality
Place of birth missing (living people)
Tennis players at the 1984 Summer Olympics
Tennis players at the 1988 Summer Olympics
Sportspeople from the Capital Region of Denmark